The women's high jump event at the 1999 Summer Universiade was held on 8 and 9 July at the Estadio Son Moix in Palma de Mallorca, Spain.

Medalists

Results

Qualification
Qualification: 1.93 (Q) or at least 12 best performers (q) advance to the final

Final

References

Athletics at the 1999 Summer Universiade
1999 in women's athletics
1999